Afzal may refer to:

Places
Afzal, Iran, a village in East Azerbaijan Province, Iran
Chah Afzal, Yazd

People
First name or given name
Afzal Ansari (born 1953), Indian politician
Afzal Hossain (born 1954), Bangladeshi actor, director, writer and painter 
Afzal Khan (British politician) (born 1958), British Labour Party politician 
Afzal Khan (general) (died 1659), a medieval Indian commander
Afzal Khan (actor), better known as John Rambo, Pakistani actor and comedian
Afzal Kahn (automotive designer), British automotive designer
Afzal Guru or Mohammad Afzal, (1969–2013), a Kashmiri terrorist, who was convicted for his role in the 2001 Indian Parliament attack
Afzal Ahmed Khan, Indian film director and producer
Afzal Khokhar (born 1974), Pakistani politician 
Afzal Ahmed Syed, Urdu poet and translator
Afzal Sharif, Bangladeshi television and film actor
Afzal Tahir, (born 1949), Pakistani admiral, writer and military historian
Afzal Yusuf, Indian music composer in the South Indian film industry

Middle name
Muhammad Afzal Sindhu (born 1935), Pakistani politician and lawmaker who is a member of the National Assembly
Nadeem Afzal Chan (born 1975), aka Nadeem Afzal Gondal, Pakistani politician
Saira Afzal Tarar (born 1966), Pakistani politician and government minister

Surname
Abdullah Afzal (born 1989), English actor and stand-up comedian of Pakistani British descent
Fawzia Afzal-Khan, university professor 
Nazir Afzal (born 1962), British lawyer who campaigns on issues around child sexual exploitation and violence against women
Sahiba Afzal, Pakistani film actress
Syed Muhammad Afzal, Bengali politician
Tanwir Afzal (born 1988), Hong Kong cricketer

See also
Articles beginning with "Afzal"
Afzal Khan (disambiguation), several people
Chah Afzal (disambiguation), various locations in Iran
Mohammad Afzal (disambiguation), several people

Pakistani masculine given names